Vincent Liff (c. 1951–2003) was an American casting director of Broadway musicals and plays. According to NPR, he "changed the face of Broadway by bringing more children, minorities and foreigners to the stage."

Early life
Vincent Liff was born circa 1951. His uncle Biff Liff, was a Broadway manager and producer.

Career
Liff was a casting director. In the 1970s, he met Geoffrey Johnson through his uncle. Together, they founded Liff-Johnson, a casting agency. Their first casting job was for The Wiz, a 1975 musical on Broadway. They went on to cast two more Broadway musicals: Ain't Misbehavin' in 1978, and Dreamgirls in 1981. Additionally, they cast the following plays: Night and Day, Indiscretions, The Elephant Man, Morning's at Seven, Amadeus, The Dresser, Contact, and The Producers.

According to NPR, he "changed the face of Broadway by bringing more children, minorities and foreigners to the stage."

Personal life
Liff was openly gay. He was in a romantic relationship with Ken Yung. They resided in Manhattan, New York City.

Death
He died of brain cancer in 2003.

References

1950s births
2003 deaths
People from Manhattan
American casting directors
American gay men
Deaths from brain cancer in the United States
Deaths from cancer in New York (state)
LGBT people from New York (state)
20th-century American LGBT people